Mangsan is a village in Paletwa Township, Mindat District, in the Chin State of Myanmar, about four kilometers north-west from the town of Kawang.

Notes

External links
 "Mangsan Map — Satellite Images of Mangsan" Maplandia

Populated places in Chin State